The Triumvirate of 1813 (Driemanschap van 1813) formed the provisional government of the Netherlands after Charles-François Lebrun and the French troops had left the country. It consisted of Gijsbert Karel van Hogendorp, Frans Adam van der Duyn van Maasdam and Leopold of Limburg Stirum. Proclaimed by declaration on 20 November 1813, the three statesmen invited the almost forgotten Prince William Frederick of Orange-Nassau to The Hague to prevent anarchy or a possible annexation of the Netherlands by Prussia or England. William Frederick arrived in Scheveningen on 30 November and accepted sovereignty of the newly established Sovereign Principality of the United Netherlands on 2 December 1813. The Triumvirate, having completed its objective, was disestablished on 6 December. William Frederick would go on to become the first King of the Netherlands as William I in 1815.

References

External links
 

1813 in the Netherlands